Rian T. Wallace (born May 24, 1982) is a former American football linebacker. He was drafted by the Pittsburgh Steelers in the fifth round of the 2005 NFL Draft. He won Super Bowl XL with the team, beating the Seattle Seahawks. He played college football at Temple. Wallace was also a member of the Washington Redskins and New York Sentinels.

Professional career

New York Sentinels
Wallace was signed by the New York Sentinels of the United Football League on September 9, 2009.

References

External links
Just Sports Stats
Pittsburgh Steelers bio
United Football League bio

1982 births
Living people
American football linebackers
New York Sentinels players
People from Pottstown, Pennsylvania
Pittsburgh Steelers players
Players of American football from Pennsylvania
Sportspeople from Montgomery County, Pennsylvania
Temple Owls football players
Washington Redskins players
Winnipeg Blue Bombers players